KGRO (1230 AM) is a radio station licensed to Pampa, Texas.  The station broadcasts an adult contemporary format and is owned by Southwest Media Group - Pampa LLC

References

External links
KGRO's official website

GRO
Mainstream adult contemporary radio stations in the United States